Clarendon station is a side platformed Washington Metro station in the Clarendon neighborhood of Arlington, Virginia, United States. The station was opened on December 1, 1979, and is operated by the Washington Metropolitan Area Transit Authority (WMATA). The station serves the Orange and Silver Lines. In 2017, over 4,000 commuters used Clarendon station every day.

Location
Clarendon is located in the Arlington district of the same name at the intersection of Highland Street, Clarendon Boulevard, and Wilson Boulevard. The station entrance itself lies in a park-like median between Clarendon and Wilson Boulevards. There is an underpass providing access to the Omsted Building on the south side of Clarendon Boulevard.

The presence of Clarendon station has transformed the surrounding district into an urban village. As a result, a number of residential and shopping complexes have opened. These include the residential buildings such as Station Square, Clarendon 1021, The Phoenix at Clarendon, and The Hartford along with the Market Common Clarendon shopping center.

History
The station was constructed by the Nello L. Teer Company, and opened on December 1, 1979.

From March 26, 2020 until June 28, 2020, this station was closed due to the COVID-19 pandemic.

Station layout 

Similar to many of the stations opened at the same time, Clarendon uses a side platform setup with two tracks. Architecturally, as part of the first generation of underground stations, the "waffle" coffer style predominates at Clarendon.

Escalators bring passengers to the mezzanine level, which contains the faregates and ticket machines. Clarendon station is quite shallow, so much in fact that there is a staircase in between the two escalators that reach street level.

References

External links 
 

 The Schumin Web Transit Center: Clarendon Station
 Highland Street entrance from Google Maps Street View

Stations on the Orange Line (Washington Metro)
Stations on the Silver Line (Washington Metro)
Transportation in Arlington County, Virginia
Washington Metro stations in Virginia
Railway stations in the United States opened in 1979
1979 establishments in Virginia